is a railway station on the Takayama Main Line in the city of Takayama, Gifu Prefecture, Japan, operated by Central Japan Railway Company (JR Central).

Lines

Station layout

Takayama Station has one ground-level side platform and one ground-level island platform connected by a footbridge. The station has a Midori no Madoguchi staffed ticket office. The ticket gates are located on the side platform.

Platforms

Adjacent stations

History

Takayama Station opened on October 25, 1934. The station was absorbed into the JR Central network upon the privatization of Japanese National Railways (JNR) on April 1, 1987.

Passenger statistics
In fiscal 2015, the station was used by an average of 1,539 passengers daily (boarding passengers only).

Surrounding area
Takayama City Hall

Takayama Nouhi Bus Center 
The Takayama Nouhi Bus Center is located next to this station.

Local buses 
 For Shirakawa-gō
 For Hirayu Onsen, Shinhotaka
 Sarubobo Bus; For Hida no Sato, Matsuri no Mori
 Machinami Bus; For Sakurayama Hachimagu Shrine, Betsuin Temple, Sanmachi-Dori (Loop)

Long-distance buses 
 Chūō Kōsoku Bus; For Shinjuku Station
 Hida Takayama; For Nagoya Station
 For Meitetsu Gifu Station
 For Shirakawa-gō, Toyama Station
 For Shirakawa-gō, Kanazawa Station
 For Matsumoto Bus Terminal (Matsumoto Station)
 For Kyoto Station, Osaka Station, and Osaka Namba Station (Osaka City Air Terminal

See also
 List of Railway Stations in Japan

References

External links

Railway stations in Gifu Prefecture
Takayama Main Line
Railway stations in Japan opened in 1934
Stations of Central Japan Railway Company
Takayama, Gifu